Abakan Range is a mountain range in Southwestern Siberia, located mainly in Khakassia, Russia:  It is mostly covered by taiga, up to , followed by mountainous tundra. The range also consists sparse areas of granite, gabbro, and diorite.

Geography
It is at the southern border of the Kuznetsk Depression that contains the Kuznetsk Basin of Kemerovo Oblast. The range is part of the water divide between Abakan River, Tom River, and Lebed River. It is a Northern extension of Altai Mountains and Southern extension of Kuznetsk Alatau.

Vegetation
Higher than that, the mountains are covered in tundra.

See also
Geography of South-Central Siberia

References

External links

Mountain ranges of Russia
Landforms of Khakassia
Landforms of Kemerovo Oblast